Badminton competition at the 1990 Central American and Caribbean Games took place between 27 November and 3 December at the Coyoacan Sports center in Mexico City.  It was the inaugural appearance for badminton at the Games.

Medal summary

Medal table

Men's events

Women's events

Mixed events

Participants

References

External links 
 Badminton - page 159 - PDF
 XVI American & Caribbean Games at the www.tournamentsoftware.com

1990 Central American and Caribbean Games
Central American and Caribbean Games
1990
Central American and Caribbean Games